Brigadier Henry Lawrence Scott  (1882-1971) was the Chief of Staff of Jammu and Kashmir Forces between 1936 and 1947.

Works 

 The Options in 1947

References 

British Indian Army officers
Companions of the Order of the Bath
Companions of the Distinguished Service Order
Recipients of the Military Cross
1882 births
1971 deaths